MV Caledonia was a roll-on roll-off vehicle ferry operated by Caledonian MacBrayne in Scotland.

History
Built as Stena Baltica in 1966, she operated on various Scandinavian routes.

In 1970, she was acquired by the Caledonian Steam Packet Company and rebuilt at Scott Lithgow in Greenock. Renamed Caledonia, she replaced , on the Isle of Arran route, becoming the first roll-on roll-off ferry on this route. She soon proved too small for the route (as well as criticisms of her abilities, being replaced by ) and was moved to Oban, until April 1988, when she was replaced by the larger .

Purchased for conversion to a floating restaurant, she was laid up in Dundee until December 1988, when she was sold for service in Italy, as Heidi. In 2005, she sank at her moorings in Naples, was re-floated and towed to Aliağa, Turkey for scrapping.

References

Caledonian MacBrayne
1966 ships